2K9 may refer to:

 the year 2009
 Major League Baseball 2K9, 2009 video game
 NBA 2K9, 2008 video game
 NHL 2K9, 2008 video game